"Beautiful Boy (Darling Boy)" is a song written and performed by John Lennon. It was released on the 1980 album Double Fantasy, the last album by Lennon and Ono released before his death.

Paul McCartney has stated this is one of his favourite songs composed by Lennon, and when he appeared on Desert Island Discs in 1982 included it as his favourite in his selection, as did Yoko Ono as the only John Lennon song in 2007.

It was used as the B-side of "Happy Xmas (War Is Over)" to promote the compilation album The John Lennon Collection in November 1982.

Lyrics
The song was for Lennon's son, Sean, his only child with Yoko Ono. It begins with John comforting his son from what is presumably a nightmare and develops into John passionately describing the love he has for his son and the joy Sean gave him.

At the end of the song, John Lennon whispers, "Good night, Sean. See you in the morning. Bright and early."

The lyrics of "Beautiful Boy (Darling Boy)" contain the famous Allen Saunders 1957 Reader's Digest quote "Life is what happens to you while you're busy making other plans".

Personnel
John Lennon – vocals, acoustic guitar, vocoder
Earl Slick – acoustic guitar
Hugh McCracken – lead guitar
Tony Levin – bass guitar
George Small – keyboards
Robert Greenidge – steelpan
Arthur Jenkins – percussion
Randy Stein – English concertina

Celine Dion version

"Beautiful Boy" was recorded by Celine Dion for her album, Miracle (2004). It was released on 4 October 2004, in North America and parts of Europe as the first promotional single.

The song reached number two on the Quebec Airplay Chart. "Beautiful Boy" was also popular on adult contemporary charts, peaking at number 18 in the US and number 23 in Canada. It also reached number 30 on the Hungarian Airplay Chart.

Dion performed this song on a few US TV shows, including Live with Regis and Kelly.

Charts

In other media
In 2014, Lennon's version was played in the DreamWorks movie Mr. Peabody & Sherman as background during Mr. Peabody's journey through his memories of Sherman as he grew up. The song was also included as track 7 on the movie soundtrack.
US sitcom The New Normal used the song in its season one finale, "The Big Day".
 "Beautiful Boy" is played by autistic character in the CBS show God Friended Me in 2018.
 The line "Life is what happens to you when you're busy making other plans" is referred in the 2015 video game Life Is Strange.
 The same line is referred in the song 'Right Side Of Wrong' from Bon Jovi, which was released on their Album 'Bounce' in 2002. 
 "Beautiful Boy" (2018) by Felix Van Groeningen was named after Lennon's song, his song is also sung by the main character to his own son.
 In "Mr. Holland's Opus" (1995), the song is sung and signed in American sign language by the title character (played by Richard Dreyfuss) to his deaf son, Cole.
 "Beautiful Trail", a contrafactum version celebrating the Appalachian Trail, was released by Manhappalachia in 2015.

References

External links

John Lennon songs
Celine Dion songs
1980 songs
1981 singles
2004 singles
Songs written by John Lennon
Song recordings produced by Jack Douglas (record producer)
Song recordings produced by David Foster
Song recordings produced by John Lennon
Song recordings produced by Yoko Ono
Songs about children
Songs about parenthood
Geffen Records singles
Columbia Records singles
Epic Records singles